USS L. Mendel Rivers (SSN-686), a Sturgeon-class attack submarine in commission from 1975 to 2001, is the only ship of the United States Navy thus far to have been named for L. Mendel Rivers (1905–1970), U.S. Representative from South Carolinas 1st Congressional District (1941–1970).

Construction and commissioning
The contract to build L. Mendel Rivers was awarded to Newport News Shipbuilding and Dry Dock Company in Newport News, Virginia, on 1 July 1969 and her keel was laid down there on 26 June 1971. She was launched on 2 June 1973, sponsored by L. Mendel Rivers two daughters, Margaret Rivers Eastman and Marion Rivers, and commissioned on 1 February 1975.

Service history

Her first deployment was to the Mediterranean Sea from January through July 1976.

During the 1990s, L. Mendel Rivers was fitted with a dry-deck shelter which contained a hyperbaric chamber, airlock, and vehicle hangar that allowed her to deploy SEAL Delivery Vehicles.

Decommissioning and disposal
L. Mendel Rivers was decommissioned on 10 May 2001 and stricken from the Naval Vessel Register the same day. Her scrapping via the Nuclear-Powered Ship and Submarine Recycling Program at Puget Sound Naval Shipyard in Bremerton, Washington, was completed on 19 July 2002.

Commemoration
L. Mendel Rivers ships plaque is on display at the Patriots Point Naval and Maritime Museum in Mount Pleasant, South Carolina. the L. Mendel Rivers ships patch is on display at the Submarine Force Library and Museum in Groton, Connecticut, with the patches of all Sturgeon-class attack submarine.

In Popular Culture
Archive footage of the vessel was used in the TV series The Six Million Dollar Man'''s Season Six opener Sharks.

USS L. Mendel Rivers is one of the playable Sturgeon-class submarines in 2017 video game Cold Waters''.

References 

NavSource Online: Submarine Photo Archive L. Mendell Rivers (SSN-686)

 

Ships built in Newport News, Virginia
Sturgeon-class submarines
Cold War submarines of the United States
Nuclear submarines of the United States Navy
1973 ships